This article contains a list of station stops made by the first Freedom Train on its 48-state tour.

1947

September 1947
 September 17–September 19 - Philadelphia, Pennsylvania
 September 20 - Atlantic City, New Jersey
 September 21 - Trenton, New Jersey
 September 22 - Elizabeth, New Jersey
 September 23 - Paterson, New Jersey
 September 24–September 26 - New York, New York
 September 27 - Brooklyn, New York
 September 28 - Jamaica, Queens, New York (Long Island)
 September 30 - Van Nest, Bronx, New York (The Bronx)

October 1947
 October 1 - Stamford, Connecticut
 October 2 - Bridgeport, Connecticut
 October 3 - Waterbury, Connecticut
 October 4 - Hartford, Connecticut
 October 5 - New Haven, Connecticut
 October 7 - New London, Connecticut
 October 8 - Providence, Rhode Island
 October 9 - Worcester, Massachusetts
 October 10 - Lynn, Massachusetts
 October 11 - Boston, Massachusetts (North Station)
 October 12 - Boston, Massachusetts (South Station)
 October 13 - Rutland, Vermont
 October 15 - Burlington, Vermont
 October 16 - Montpelier, Vermont
 October 18 - Nashua, New Hampshire
 October 19 - Lowell, Massachusetts
 October 20 - Lawrence, Massachusetts
 October 22 - Haverhill, Massachusetts
 October 23 - Dover, New Hampshire
 October 24 - Augusta, Maine
 October 25 - Bangor, Maine
 October 26 - Lewiston, Maine
 October 27 - Manchester, New Hampshire
 October 28 - Fitchburg, Massachusetts
 October 30 - Springfield, Massachusetts
 October 31 - Pittsfield, Massachusetts

November 1947
 November 1 - Schenectady, New York
 November 2 - Utica, New York
 November 4 - Rome, New York
 November 5 - Syracuse, New York
 November 6 - Rochester, New York
 November 7 - Buffalo, New York
 November 8 - Elmira, New York
 November 9 - Binghamton, New York
 November 11 - Albany, New York
 November 12 - Scranton, Pennsylvania
 November 13 - Wilkes-Barre, Pennsylvania
 November 14 - Williamsport, Pennsylvania
 November 15 - Altoona, Pennsylvania
 November 16 - Harrisburg, Pennsylvania
 November 18 - Reading, Pennsylvania
 November 19 - Allentown, Pennsylvania
 November 20 - Chester, Pennsylvania
 November 21 - Wilmington, Delaware
 November 22 - Salisbury, Maryland
 November 23 - Dover, Delaware
 November 25–November 26 - Baltimore, Maryland
 November 27–November 28 - Washington, D.C.
 November 29 - Charlottesville, Virginia
 November 30 - Lynchburg, Virginia

December 1947
 December 2 - Roanoke, Virginia
 December 3 - Winston-Salem, North Carolina
 December 4 - Charlotte, North Carolina
 December 5 - Greensboro, North Carolina
 December 6 - Raleigh, North Carolina
 December 7 - Norfolk, Virginia
 December 9 - Richmond, Virginia
 December 10 - Wilmington, North Carolina
 December 11 - Columbia, South Carolina
 December 12 - Spartanburg, South Carolina
 December 13 - Greenville, South Carolina
 December 14 - Augusta, Georgia
 December 16 - Charleston, South Carolina
 December 17 - Savannah, Georgia
 December 18 - Brunswick, Georgia
 December 19 - Jacksonville, Florida
 December 20 - Miami, Florida
 December 21 - Tampa, Florida
 December 22 - Tallahassee, Florida
 December 23 - Pensacola, Florida
 December 26 - Mobile, Alabama
 December 27 - Montgomery, Alabama
 December 28 - Tuscaloosa, Alabama
 December 29 - Columbus, Georgia
 December 31 - Macon, Georgia

1948

January 1948
 January 1–January 2 - Atlanta, Georgia
 January 3 - Chattanooga, Tennessee
 January 4 - Nashville, Tennessee
 January 6 - Jackson, Tennessee
 January 7–January 8 - New Orleans, Louisiana
 January 9 - Hattiesburg, Mississippi
 January 10 - Meridian, Mississippi
 January 11 - Jackson, Mississippi
 January 13 - Vicksburg, Mississippi
 January 14 - Monroe, Louisiana
 January 15 - Alexandria, Louisiana
 January 16 - Baton Rouge, Louisiana
 January 17 - Shreveport, Louisiana
 January 18 - Texarkana, Arkansas/Texarkana, Texas
 January 19 - Little Rock, Arkansas
 January 21 - Pine Bluff, Arkansas
 January 22 - Fort Smith, Arkansas
 January 23 - Muskogee, Oklahoma
 January 24 - Tulsa, Oklahoma
 January 25 - Oklahoma City, Oklahoma
 January 27 - Enid, Oklahoma
 January 28 - Ada, Oklahoma
 January 29 - Denison, Texas
 January 30–January 31 - Dallas, Texas

February 1948

 February 1 - Fort Worth, Texas
 February 2 - Waco, Texas
 February 3 - Tyler, Texas
 February 4 - Beaumont, Texas
 February 5–February 6 - Houston, Texas
 February 7 - Galveston, Texas
 February 8 - Harlingen, Texas
 February 10 - Corpus Christi, Texas
 February 11 - Austin, Texas
 February 12 - San Antonio, Texas
 February 13 - Del Rio, Texas
 February 14 - El Paso, Texas
 February 15 - Santa Fe, New Mexico
 February 16 - Albuquerque, New Mexico
 February 18 - Douglas, Arizona
 February 19 - Tucson, Arizona
 February 20 - Phoenix, Arizona
 February 21 - Yuma, Arizona
 February 22 - San Diego, California
 February 23–February 26 - Los Angeles, California
 February 27 - Pasadena, California
 February 28 - Long Beach, California
 February 29 - San Bernardino, California

March 1948
 March 1–March 8 - the train receives a complete overhaul, including a new coat of paint, at the Atchison, Topeka and Santa Fe Railway shops in San Bernardino.
 March 9 - Riverside, California
 March 10 - Bakersfield, California
 March 11 - Fresno, California
 March 12 - Modesto, California
 March 13 - Stockton, California
 March 14–March 16 - San Francisco, California
 March 17 - Palo Alto, California
 March 18 - San Jose, California
 March 19 - Oakland, California
 March 20 - Sacramento, California
 March 21 - Reno, Nevada
 March 23 - Elko, Nevada
 March 24 - Salt Lake City, Utah
 March 25 - Provo, Utah
 March 26 - Ogden, Utah
 March 27 - Pocatello, Idaho
 March 29 - Boise, Idaho
 March 30 - Walla Walla, Washington
 March 31 - Yakima, Washington

April 1948
 April 1–April 2 - Portland, Oregon
 April 3 - Eugene, Oregon
 April 4 - Corvallis, Oregon
 April 6 - Salem, Oregon
 April 7 - Olympia, Washington
 April 8 - Tacoma, Washington
 April 9–April 10 - Seattle, Washington
 April 12 - Wenatchee, Washington
 April 13 - Spokane, Washington
 April 14 - Coeur d'Alene, Idaho
 April 15 - Missoula, Montana
 April 16 - Butte, Montana
 April 17 - Helena, Montana
 April 18 - Great Falls, Montana
 April 20 - Billings, Montana
 April 21 - Sheridan, Wyoming
 April 22 - Rapid City, South Dakota
 April 23 - Pierre, South Dakota
 April 24 - Aberdeen, South Dakota
 April 26 - Bismarck, North Dakota
 April 27 - Minot, North Dakota
 April 28 - Jamestown, North Dakota
 April 29 - Fargo, North Dakota
 April 30 - Grand Forks, North Dakota

May 1948
 May 1 - Duluth, Minnesota
 May 2 - Superior, Wisconsin
 May 3–May 4 - St. Paul, Minnesota
 May 5–May 6 - Minneapolis, Minnesota
 May 7 - Brainerd, Minnesota
 May 8 - St. Cloud, Minnesota
 May 10 - Willmar, Minnesota
 May 11 - Watertown, South Dakota
 May 12 - Sioux Falls, South Dakota
 May 13 - Sioux City, Iowa
 May 14–May 15 - Omaha, Nebraska
 May 16 - Lincoln, Nebraska
 May 17 - Grand Island, Nebraska
 May 19 - Alliance, Nebraska
 May 20 - Casper, Wyoming
 May 21 - Cheyenne, Wyoming
 May 22–May 23 - Denver, Colorado
 May 24 - Colorado Springs, Colorado
 May 25 - Pueblo, Colorado
 May 26 - Trinidad, Colorado
 May 27 - Amarillo, Texas
 May 29 - Hutchinson, Kansas
 May 30 - Wichita, Kansas
 May 31 - Emporia, Kansas

June 1948
 June 1 - Topeka, Kansas
 June 2 - Lawrence, Kansas
 June 3 - Parsons, Kansas
 June 4 - Joplin, Missouri
 June 5 - Springfield, Missouri
 June 6–June 7 - Kansas City, Missouri
 June 9 - St. Joseph, Missouri
 June 10 - Sedalia, Missouri
 June 11 - Jefferson City, Missouri
 June 12–June 14 - St. Louis, Missouri
 June 15 - Hannibal, Missouri
 June 16 - Quincy, Illinois
 June 17 - Burlington, Iowa
 June 18 - Iowa City, Iowa
 June 19 - Cedar Rapids, Iowa
 June 20 - Des Moines, Iowa
 June 21 - Davenport, Iowa
 June 23 - Rockford, Illinois
 June 24 - Madison, Wisconsin
 June 25 - La Crosse, Wisconsin
 June 26 - Eau Claire, Wisconsin
 June 27 - Wausau, Wisconsin
 June 29 - Green Bay, Wisconsin
 June 30 - Oshkosh, Wisconsin

July 1948
 July 1–July 2 - Milwaukee, Wisconsin
 July 3 - Racine, Wisconsin
 July 4 - Kenosha, Wisconsin
 July 5–July 9 - Chicago, Illinois (Chicago Railroad Fair)
 July 10 - Gary, Indiana
 July 11 - Joliet, Illinois
 July 13 - Peoria, Illinois
 July 14 - Bloomington, Illinois
 July 15 - Kankakee, Illinois
 July 16 - Champaign, Illinois
 July 17 - Decatur, Illinois
 July 18 - Springfield, Illinois
 July 20 - Belleville, Illinois
 July 21 - Cairo, Illinois
 July 22 - Paducah, Kentucky
 July 23 - Evansville, Indiana
 July 24 - Vincennes, Indiana
 July 25 - Terre Haute, Indiana
 July 27 - Danville, Illinois
 July 28 - Logansport, Indiana
 July 29–July 30 - Indianapolis, Indiana
 July 31–August 1 - Louisville, Kentucky

August 1948
 August 2 - Bowling Green, Kentucky
 August 3 - Frankfort, Kentucky
 August 4 - Lexington, Kentucky
 August 5 - Ashland, Kentucky
 August 6 - Portsmouth, Ohio
 August 7–August 8 - Cincinnati, Ohio
 August 10 - Muncie, Indiana
 August 11 - Fort Wayne, Indiana
 August 12 - South Bend, Indiana
 August 13 - Kalamazoo, Michigan
 August 14 - Grand Rapids, Michigan
 August 15 - Muskegon, Michigan
 August 17 - Lansing, Michigan
 August 18 - Battle Creek, Michigan
 August 19 - Ann Arbor, Michigan
 August 20–August 22 - Detroit, Michigan
 August 24 - Jackson, Michigan
 August 25 - Flint, Michigan
 August 26 - Saginaw, Michigan
 August 27 - Port Huron, Michigan
 August 28 - Pontiac, Michigan
 August 29 - Dearborn, Michigan
 August 30 - Monroe, Michigan
 August 31 - Toledo, Ohio

September 1948
 September 1 - Sandusky, Ohio
 September 2–September 3 - Cleveland, Ohio
 September 4 - Akron, Ohio
 September 5–September 6 - Columbus, Ohio
 September 7 - Dayton, Ohio
 September 8 - Springfield, Ohio
 September 9 - Lima, Ohio
 September 10 - Canton, Ohio
 September 11 - Youngstown, Ohio
 September 12 - Steubenville, Ohio
 September 14 - Wheeling, West Virginia
 September 15–September 17 - Pittsburgh, Pennsylvania
 September 18 - Erie, Pennsylvania
 September 19 - Oil City, Pennsylvania
 September 21 - Johnstown, Pennsylvania
 September 22 - Cumberland, Maryland
 September 23 - Parkersburg, West Virginia
 September 24 - Clarksburg, West Virginia
 September 25 - Charleston, West Virginia
 September 26 - Huntington, West Virginia
 September 28 - Bluefield, West Virginia
 September 29 - Bristol, Tennessee
 September 30 - Johnson City, Tennessee

October 1948
 October 1 - Kingsport, Tennessee
 October 2 - Knoxville, Tennessee
 October 3 - Oak Ridge, Tennessee
 October 5 - Asheville, North Carolina
 October 6 - Danville, Virginia
 October 7 - Winchester, Virginia
 October 8 - Hagerstown, Maryland
 October 9 - York, Pennsylvania
 October 10 - Lancaster, Pennsylvania
 October 11 - Easton, Pennsylvania
 October 12 - Morristown, New Jersey
 October 13–October 14 - Jersey City, New Jersey
 October 15 - Princeton, New Jersey
 October 16–October 17 - Camden, New Jersey
 October 19 - Red Bank, New Jersey
 October 20 - Orange, New Jersey
 October 21 - Montclair, New Jersey
 October 22 - Passaic, New Jersey
 October 23 - Ridgewood, New Jersey
 October 24 - Hackensack, New Jersey
 October 25 - New Brunswick, New Jersey
 October 26 - Havre de Grace, Maryland

1949

January 1949
 January 22 - Washington, D.C.

References
 Timeline for the 1947-1949 Freedom Train, retrieved December 23, 2004.

History of rail transportation in the United States